Oleh Drozdov (born September 12, 1966) is a Ukrainian architect, artist, and educator. Founder of the architectural bureau Drozdov&Partners and co-founder of the Kharkiv School of Architecture.

Biography 
Oleh Drozdov was born on September 12, 1966, in Volgodonsk (USSR). In 1990, he graduated from the Kharkiv Civil Engineering Institute, School of Architecture. While studying at the university, he and his colleagues implemented the first small projects. These were mostly interiors, small cafés and clubs.

In 1990, after graduating from the university, he was assigned to the city of Sumy (Ukraine), where he led an architectural design team in the office of the chief architect until 1993.

From 1991 to 1997, he pursued his career of an artist.

Architecture 
In 1996, Oleg Drozdov started his career in architecture and,  together with partners, founded an architectural office, ‘Atrium’. In 1997, ‘Atrium’ was reorganised, renamed and continued its work with new partners. Oleg became a founder and the Chief Architect of Drozdov&Partners, working in Ukraine and abroad. In Kharkiv, the landmark works of Drozdov&Partners include famous business centers Ave Plaza and Platinum Plaza, Yaske restaurant in Danylevskoho st., Status boutique in Sumska st., Prizma shopping centre in Nauky Ave., Heirloom office and residential building in Chernyshevska st., and Carat residential building in Potebni st.

Since 2008, the bureau is a branch of the Department of Fundamentals of Architecture of the Kharkiv National University of Construction and Architecture. It provides educational programs for students and interns, conducts lectures and seminars.

Theater on Podil, Ukraine 
In 2015, Oleg Drozdov was selected as an architect for the Theater on Podil in Kyiv. The Theatre was built under the patronage of the Roshen Corporation, which invested UAH 174 million.

The theater has provoked much discussion and criticism because of its modernist architecture. Many citizens did not like the reconstruction of the building in the historical part of Kyiv, which caused outrage and protests.

At the same time, there were many defenders of the new theater building, who believed that the Podil area needed modern architecture and wondered why Kyivans did not accept modern art.

In 2018, the reconstruction project of the Podil Theater won the Grand Prix of the Ukrainian Urban Awards architectural competition and took the first prize in the Architecture of Cultural and Social Objects category.

In 2019, the restored building of the Theater in Podil was nominated for the European Architectural Award Mies van der Rohe Award 2019.

Educational Projects 
In 2011, Oleg Drozdov co-authored and reviewed the Spring Semester Studio Workshop on Urban Design for students of the School of Architecture, Columbia University GSAPP.

In 2017, on the initiative of Oleg Drozdov, the Kharkiv School of Architecture was founded. It is a private school for architects and urban planners. Drozdov is a co-founder of the Kharkiv School of Architecture and a lecturer at the Department of Architecture and Urbanism. This is the first private architectural school in independent Ukraine. It was funded by eight businessmen from Kyiv, Kharkiv, and Odesa. The Kharkiv School of Architecture is licensed to award the Bachelor's Degree in Architecture and Urbanism.

In 2020, the Kharkiv School of Architecture announced a competition "Be an Architect" for high school students from all over Ukraine. The prizes were certificates for studying architecture at civil engineering and construction universities and participating in the School’s programs.

Exhibitions, research, and curated projects 
 2003 – “Modern Ukrainian Architecture” exhibition, University of Florence, Italy
 2003 − "Architectural Ambulance" international seminar initiator, Kharkiv

 2005 − "Monisto: the concept of developing the Odesa coast" Ukrainian national project curator, the International Architecture Biennale, Rotterdam, the Netherlands

 2006 − "Patiology: density, typology, and privacy of living spaces" exhibition and conference project curator, Ukraine

 2008−2010 – "Roddom Institute" educational project initiator together with Yuri Rintovt and Alberto Foye, Kharkiv

 2010 − "Growing or Shrinking" conference organizer, Kharkiv
 2010 − "Odesa Mama" three project presentations and exhibitions by "Drozdov & Partners" young professionals, curator, Kharkiv
 2011 − "Identity of Space" international symposium organizer, Kharkiv
2012 − "Circumstances" exhibition project curator, the Moscow Biennale of Architecture

Selected Projects by Drozdov&Partners 

 House of Restaurants сatering complex (Kharkiv, 2001−2006)

 Status boutique, Sumska st. (Kharkiv, 2003)

 Yaske restaurant, Danylevskoho st. (Kharkiv, 2004)

 Platinum Plaza business center, Sumska st. (Kharkiv, 2006−2010)

 Heirloom office and residential building, Chernyshevskoho st. (Kharkiv, 2007−2010)⦁	[29]

 Carat residential building, Potebny st. (Kharkiv, 2003−2011)

 Ave Plaza shopping center, Sumska st. (Kharkiv, 2003−2011)

 House with a Peristyle private residence (Kharkiv, 2009−2015

 Ark private residence (Kharkiv, 2010−2015)

 Café Très restaurant, Montreux (Switzerland, 2015−2016)

 Baked by the Heat private residence (Kharkiv, 2010−2016)

 Theater on Podil (Kyiv, 2015−2017)

 Sense dental clinic (Kharkiv, 2017−2018)

 Aloft Hotel (Kyiv, 2010−2018)

 VG Horse Club (Kharkiv, 2016−2019

Awards 

 2001 − Grand Prix of the "IHTEP'YEAR" Ukrainian competition for the Florence restaurant project
 2002 − First Prize in the "Commercial Interior" nomination in "IHTEP'YEAR" Ukrainian competition for the project Symbol Baby
 2003 − Grand Prix of the "IHTEP'YEAR" Ukrainian competition for the Tampopo restaurant project

 2011 – Third Prize from “A New School Vision” Cleveland Design Competition, USA, 2012, for the School Garden project

 2012 − Second Prize of the Voronov Museum of Contemporary Art competition, Kyiv, Ukraine

 2012 – Best Curated Project at the Moscow Biennale of Architecture, for "Circumstances" project

 2014 – First Prize of the Daegu International Architecture Competition, South Korea for the Dalseong Citizen's Gymnasium project).

 2018 − Grand Prix of the National Ukrainian Urban Awards and the Best Project in the "Architecture of Cultural and Social Facilities" nomination for the Theatre on Podil

 2018 − Architect of the Year, EDIDA (Elle Decoration International Design Awards)

 2018 – Hotel Project of the Year, EE Real Estate Project Awards, for Aloft Hotel, Kyiv

 2018 – Architectural Office of the Year, EE Real Estate Project Awards
2018 – Nomination for the European Union Mies van der Rohe Architectural Award, 2019, for the Theatre on Podil

 2021 – Nominations for the European Union Mies van der Rohe Architectural Award, 2022, for Sense Dental Clinic and for VG Horse Club projects

External links 

 Official website 
 Архітектор проти міста: Олег Дроздов – про жлобські новобудови, Театр на Подолі й «Тарілку» 
 Олег Дроздов: Киев повторяет путь Москвы, это государство в государстве. И это плохой путь

Reference 

Ukrainian architects
People from Volgodonsk
1966 births
Living people